João Vítor Bonani Rodrigues (born 25 October 1998) is a Brazilian professional footballer who plays as a forward. He is under contract with the Portuguese club Casa Pia.

Football career
On 21 July 2018, Bonani made his professional debut with Sporting Covilhã in a 2018–19 Taça da Liga match against Mafra.

References

External links

1998 births
People from Araraquara
Footballers from São Paulo (state)
Living people
Brazilian footballers
Association football forwards
S.C. Covilhã players
Casa Pia A.C. players
C.F. Estrela da Amadora players
Liga Portugal 2 players
Campeonato de Portugal (league) players
Brazilian expatriate footballers
Expatriate footballers in Portugal
Brazilian expatriate sportspeople in Portugal